"Where Are You Now" is a power ballad by the Pennsylvania-based 1980s band, Synch. Co-written and sung by Synch band member Jimmy Harnen, the song was initially credited solely to Synch when it was first released in 1986. In 1989, the song was re-released under the name Jimmy Harnen with Synch. 

Synch was a band that formed in 1985, with Jimmy Harnen as the drummer. The other band members were lead vocalist Lou Butwin, guitarist Dave Abraham, bassist James A. Donnelly (who is currently a prominent figure in broadcasting and podsafe music movement), and keyboardist Chuck Yarmey. Although not the "official" lead vocalist for the group, Harnen was afforded the chance to sing lead on his own composition. "Where Are You Now" was first released on the independent label Micki Records in 1986. After receiving local airplay in the Wilkes-Barre market, Synch got signed to Columbia Records, and "Where Are You Now" was re-recorded and re-released as a single, later also appearing in a live version on Synch's lone album, ...Get the Feelin'''. By the time this album was recorded, only Harnen and Yarmey remained from the original line-up, with Harnen now the lead vocalist. The single peaked at No. 77 on the Billboard Hot 100, leading to the band being dropped from Columbia.

However, in 1989, the song gained popularity and received heavy airplay, prompting record executives to re-release the original (major label) recording of the single, now credited to Jimmy Harnen with Synch. WTG, a new label at the time, signed Harnen as a solo artist, and while the song was climbing the charts, he began recording an album for the label. This time, the song peaked at No. 10 on the Billboard Hot 100 in June 1989. It also hit No. 3 on the Adult Contemporary chart. Harnen's debut solo album, Can't Fight the Midnight'', was released the same year.

References

External links
 

1986 songs
1986 singles
1989 singles
1980s ballads
Rock ballads
Jimmy Harnen songs
Columbia Records singles
Songs about loneliness